Kurichithanam is a village in Kottayam district in the state of Kerala, India.  K. R. Narayanan, a former president of India, was born in this village.

Demographics
The 2001 Census of India found that Kurichithanam revenue village had a population of 9158, with 4581 males and 4579 females.
Means of livelihood include mainly agriculture and cattle rearing.

References

Villages in Kottayam district